Royal Victoria Hospital may refer to:

General hospitals
 Royal Victoria Hospital, Barrie, Ontario, Canada (established 1891)
 Royal Victoria Hospital, Belfast, Northern Ireland (established 1873), the first air conditioned building in the world
 Royal Victoria Hospital, Bournemouth, England (established 1889)
 Royal Victoria Hospital, Dover, England (established 1851)
 Royal Victoria Hospital, Dundee, Scotland (established 1899)
 Royal Victoria Hospital, Edinburgh, Scotland (established 1894)
 Royal Victoria Hospital, Folkestone, England (established 1846)
 Royal Victoria Hospital, Montreal, Quebec, Canada (established 1893)
 Royal Victoria Infirmary, Newcastle upon Tyne, England (established 1751)

Specialist hospitals
 Royal Victoria Eye and Ear Hospital, Bournemouth, England (established 1887)
 Royal Victoria Eye and Ear Hospital, Dublin, Ireland (established 1897)
 Royal Victoria Military Hospital, or Netley Hospital, Hampshire, England (established 1856)